Houston Dynamos was a U.S. soccer team that existed in various forms from 1983 to 1991. In 1991, the team’s owners changed the name to Houston International, but the team lasted only through the 1992 season before folding. The Dynamos were founded by Pete Kane and John M Gaughan. The Dynamos were founded with the intention of a continued building of the sport of soccer in Houston Texas. The Dynamos were the first team to give contracts to its players based on an entire year not on a season. The Houston Dynamos players year round went to parks, schools and events promoting the sport of soccer. In 1985 the Dynamos brought Pele to Houston creating great interest in the sport and spreading goodwill.

1984: United Soccer League
In 1983, the United Soccer League (USL) was formed after the second American Soccer League (ASL) folded that year. The ASL had served as the de facto U.S. second division for decades, but collapsed due to over expansion and financial insolvency. The USL intended to avoid this fate by creating a lean, financially responsible league. In 1984, the league began play with nine teams in three regional divisions. The Houston Dynamos joined the Oklahoma City Stampede and Dallas Americans in the Western Division. The Dynamos gained a significant boost when it signed José Neto. Houston finished third in the league, but second in its division. In the wild card game, the Dynamos defeated the Dallas Americans. In the semifinals, they defeated the Oklahoma City Stampede two games to none. Their run ended in the championship, when they lost 3-0 to the Fort Lauderdale Sun in the third, and deciding, game of the series.

1984 Roster
 Manny Andruszewski
 Mike Barbarick 24 Apps 0 Goals
 Giulio Bernardi
 Beto Dos Santos
 Bob Bozada
 Glenn Davis
 Jim Elder
 Soloman Hilton
 Tony Johnson 22 Apps 11 Goals
 Mark Lugris
 William McDonald
 Jose Neto 21 Apps 22 Goals (1984 league MVP)
  Manny Neves
 Ed Puskarich
 Thomas Rafferty
 Nathan Sacks
 Walter Schlothauer
 Joseph Serralta
  Lesh Shkreli
 Roland Sikinger
 Gary Vogel

1985-1986: Independent
In 1985, the Dynamos chose not to return to the USL for the league’s second season when it became apparent the league would not survive. Despite the league’s attempt at financial austerity, it indeed folded eight games into the 1985 season. Having forsaken the USL, the Dynamos played an exhibition schedule as an independent team.

1987-1991: Lone Star Soccer Alliance
In 1987, the Dynamos entered a newly established league, the Lone Star Soccer Alliance. At the end of the 1990 season, the team ownership changed the team’s name to Houston International for the franchise's final season.

Coaches
 Gary Hindley (1984-1985) (1984 Coach of the Year)

Year-by-year

Honors
MVP
1984 José Neto

Coach of the Year
1984 Gary Hindley

Executive of the Year
1984 Peter Kane

Legacy
The MLS team the Houston Dynamo is named after the Dynamos.

References

 
United Soccer League (1984–85) teams
Lone Star Soccer Alliance teams
Defunct soccer clubs in Texas
Dynamos
Association football clubs established in 1983
Association football clubs disestablished in 1992
1983 establishments in Texas
1992 disestablishments in Texas